Jamael Orondé "Rondé" Barber (born April 7, 1975) is an American former professional football player who spent his entire 16-year career as a cornerback with the Tampa Bay Buccaneers of the National Football League (NFL). He is the identical twin brother of Tiki Barber, a former running back for the New York Giants. Barber grew up in Roanoke, Virginia and played college football for the University of Virginia.

In the 1997 NFL Draft, the Tampa Bay Buccaneers selected Ronde Barber in the third round as the 66th overall pick. Over the course of his career, Barber was selected to five Pro Bowls, accumulated three first team All-Pro selections, two second-team All-Pro selections, and was selected to the National Football League 2000s All-Decade Team. Additionally, he led the NFL in interceptions in 2001, is the Buccaneers all-time interceptions leader, is one of the two members of the 40/20 club (40+ interceptions, 20+ quarterback sacks) alongside Charles Woodson, and the only member of the 45/25 club (45+ interceptions, 25+ quarterback sacks). After the 2002 season, Barber won Super Bowl XXXVII against the Oakland Raiders. He also holds the record for most consecutive starts by a defensive back. Barber was inducted into the Virginia Sports Hall of Fame in 2014, and will be inducted into the Pro Football Hall of Fame in 2023.

Early years
The Barber twin boys were born five weeks premature. Barber was born seven minutes before his identical twin brother Tiki Barber. He was named Jamael Oronde which means "first born son". Tiki was a running back who played for the New York Giants.

Barber is the son of Geraldine Barber and James Barber. Barber was a star running back at Virginia Tech and later played in the World Football League. His roommate in college was Bruce Arians. His parents separated when Barber was very young. Barber father Daniel X., was a young struggling entertainer that traveled a lot, which did not allow him opportunities to provide suitable financial support and rarely he had time to see his sons when they were growing up. His mother Geraldine worked two, sometimes three jobs to support her three sons. He and Tiki have an older brother, Tarik Barber.

Barber graduated from Cave Spring High School of Roanoke, Virginia in 1993, and was a standout in football, wrestling, and track. In football, Barber was a three-time All-District selection. In track, Barber won the national title in the 55-meter hurdles as a senior in 1993, with a career-best time of 7.18 seconds. He was timed at 14.05 seconds in the 110-meter hurdles. He also won four Group AAA hurdles titles in indoor and outdoor track.

College career
Barber received an athletic scholarship to attend the University of Virginia, where he played for the Virginia Cavaliers football team.  He redshirted the 1993 season and played for the Cavaliers from the 1994 to 1996 seasons as a defensive back. He was also a kick returner in 1994 and 1996; in 1994, Barber returned 10 kickoffs for 171 yards, and in 1996, he returned 3 for 36 yards. As a defensive back, Barber made 15 interceptions returned for 112 yards in his career with Virginia: 8 for 56 yards in 1994, 4 for 18 yards in 1995, and 3 for 38 yards in 1996. The Atlantic Coast Conference (ACC) recognized Barber as Freshman of the Year after the 1994 season, and Barber earned first-team All-ACC honors in all his three seasons with Virginia. Barber was part of the Virginia teams that won the 1994 Independence Bowl and December 1995 Peach Bowl. After his junior season in 1996, Barber declared for the 1997 NFL Draft. Barber graduated from Virginia in 1997 with a bachelor's degree in commerce with an emphasis in marketing. During Barber’s time at UVa, he was a member of the IMP Society, one of the University’s secret societies.

Professional career
On January 3, 1997, Barber announced his decision to forgo his final season of eligibility and enter the 1997 NFL Draft. He became only the third player from the University of Virginia to enter the NFL draft with eligibility remaining.

1997
The Tampa Bay Buccaneers drafted Barber in the third round (66th overall) of the 1997 NFL Draft. Barber was the third underclassmen selected in 1997 and was the tenth cornerback. His brother, Tiki Barber, was drafted in the second round (36th overall) by the New York Giants. Ronde and Tiki Barber became only the fourth set of twins to be selected in the same draft in NFL history, following Rich and Ron Saul (1970), Reggie and Raleigh McKenzie (1985), and Keith and Kerry Cash (1991). They also became only the seventh set of twins to play in the league.

As a rookie, Barber played only one game, in Week 5 (September 28) against the Arizona Cardinals. Barber had three tackles. Tampa advanced to the divisional round of the playoffs but lost to the Green Bay Packers.

1998
In his second season, Barber started nine games (three as left cornerback and six as right cornerback) and played in all 16 games, recording 68 tackles, 17 passes deflected, 3 sacks, 2 interceptions (returned for 67 yards), 2 forced fumbles, and 12 special teams tackles.

1999
In the 1999 season, Barber again played in all 16 games and started 15 as right cornerback. Improving from his previous seasons, Barber posted 74 tackles, two interceptions (60 yards), one sack, and 16 passes deflected. Making his postseason debut this season, Barber also started both playoff games; the Buccaneers lost the NFC Championship game to eventual Super Bowl XXXIV champion St. Louis Rams.

2000
For the first time in his career, Barber started all 16 games in a season in 2000. Barber reached new career bests with 97 tackles, 20 passes deflected, and 5.5 sacks. With his 5.5 sacks, Barber led all NFC defensive backs in sacks. He had two interceptions (46 yards), one forced fumble, one fumble recovery, and six special teams tackles. For the Week 2 (September 10) game, Barber was NFC Defensive Player of the Week for 3 tackles, 2.5 sacks, a forced fumble, and a 24-yard fumble recovery for a touchdown against the Chicago Bears. Picking and returning for 37 yards a pass from former Tampa quarterback Vinny Testaverde, Barber scored his first career touchdown from an interception return in the Week 4 (September 24) 21–17 loss to the New York Jets.  In the Wild Card game on December 31, a 21–3 loss to the Philadelphia Eagles, Barber made 5 tackles.

2001
On April 9, 2001, the Tampa Bay Buccaneers signed Barber to a six-year, $18.50 million contract.

In 2001, Barber started 16 of 16 regular season games and made 71 tackles, 1 sack, 14 passes deflected, and 10 interceptions (86 yards). Barber returned an intercepted pass from Aaron Brooks 36 yards for a touchdown in the Week 15 (December 23) win over the New Orleans Saints. Barber made his first Pro Bowl and All-Pro teams this season.

2002
Starting all 16 games again this season, Barber made 79 tackles, 3 sacks, 17 passes deflected, and returned 2 interceptions for 9 yards. Barber was part of a Tampa secondary that ranked first in total defense and passes defended. Barber also started all three playoff games, including Tampa's Super Bowl XXXVII victory.

In the NFC Championship game on January 19, 2003, Barber picked off a pass from Philadelphia Eagles quarterback Donovan McNabb and returned the interception 92 yards for a touchdown late in the fourth quarter to seal Tampa's 27-10 road victory and brought Veterans Stadium to near-silence.  Bob Ford of The Philadelphia Inquirer labeled this game as "the most ignominious defeat of Andy Reid's head coaching career" because of Barber's interception return. In 2011, Tampa Bay Times sportswriter Rick Stroud ranked Barber's interception return for touchdown in the NFC Championship game as the greatest scoring play in team history. Barber also deflected 4 passes in that game. In Tampa's 48–21 victory over the Oakland Raiders in Super Bowl XXXVII on January 26, 2003, Barber made five tackles.

2003
For the fourth consecutive season, Barber started all 16 regular season games. Barber again continued to make more tackles annually with 97 this season. Additionally, Barber deflected 3 passes, returned 2 interceptions for 53 yards, and forced 3 fumbles. In Week 5 (October 6), a 38–35 overtime loss to the Indianapolis Colts, Barber returned an intercepted pass from Peyton Manning 29 yards for a touchdown.

2004
Starting all 16 regular-season games, Barber made 98 tackles, 3 sacks, 10 passes defended, 3 interceptions returned for 23 yards, and 2 forced fumbles. Chosen as a starter for the 2005 Pro Bowl, Barber made his second career Pro Bowl appearance. This season, Barber also earned first-team All-Pro honors from the Associated Press. For the second time since the 2002 Super Bowl championship season, Tampa's pass defense was number one in the league, and Tampa's total defense was in the top ten for the eighth straight season.

2005

Barber had 99 tackles, 2 sacks, 15 passes defended, and 5 interceptions returned for 105 yards in 16 games (all starts) in 2005. Barber intercepted three passes (returned for 70 yards) from Saints quarterback Aaron Brooks on December 4 (Week 13) in Tampa's 10–3 win over New Orleans, including one in the end zone in the Saints' final drive.  On December 11, in the Week 14 game against the Carolina Panthers, he became the first cornerback in the history of the NFL to record at least 20 interceptions and 20 sacks in his career. Tampa lost the Wild Card game 17–10 to the Washington Redskins, and Barber made 8 tackles that game. Barber made his third career Pro Bowl appearance in the 2006 Pro Bowl.

2006

In 2006, starting 16 of 16 regular-season games, Barber had 98 tackles and 13 passes deflected. He also returned 3 interceptions for 103 yards; two of those interceptions Barber returned for touchdowns. On October 22 (Week 7) against Philadelphia, Barber became the first player in Buccaneers history to return two interceptions for touchdowns in one regular-season game. After Barber scored in the second quarter on a 37-yard return of an interception from Donovan McNabb, Tampa took a 17–0 lead late in the third quarter with Barber's 66-yard interception return of a McNabb pass. Despite a late comeback by the Eagles, Tampa won 23–21 on a last-second field goal by Matt Bryant. Barber made his fourth career and third consecutive Pro Bowl in the 2007 Pro Bowl.

2007
Prior to the season, the team voted Barber as defensive captain. In 16 games, Barber made 58 tackles, one sack, 14 passes deflected, 2 interceptions returned for 32 yards (including a 29-yard touchdown run), and one forced fumble. On November 25, 2007, he took the record from Donnie Abraham for the most interceptions in Buccaneers team history by catching his 32nd against the Washington Redskins. In a 37–3 victory over the Atlanta Falcons on Week 15 (December 16), Barber returned an interception of Chris Redman 29 yards for a touchdown.

2008
In 2008, starting 16 of 16 regular season games for the ninth straight season, Barber made 75 tackles, 2 sacks, 12 passes defended, and 4 interceptions returned for 69 yards (including a 65-yard return for touchdown). Again a team defensive captain, Barber made his fifth career and most recent Pro Bowl appearance in the 2009 Pro Bowl. In the Week 12 (November 23), a 38–20 win over the hosting Detroit Lions, Barber intercepted Lions quarterback Daunte Culpepper twice and returned one interception 65 yards for a touchdown.

2009
In the 2009 regular season, Barber made 77 tackles, 2 sacks, 6 passes defended, and 2 forced fumbles in 16 games (all starts). However, for the first time since his 1997 rookie season, Barber did not intercept a pass the entire season. Barber had some crucial plays on special teams: in Week 4 (October 4) against the Washington Redskins, Barber blocked an extra point kick by Shaun Suisham.  In the Week 9 win over the Green Bay Packers, Barber returned a punt blocked by Geno Hayes 31 yards for a tying touchdown.  Along with Tony Dungy, Derrick Brooks, and Warren Sapp, Barber was voted to the NFL 2000s All-Decade Team prior to the 2010 Pro Bowl.

2010
Barber made 82 tackles, defended 13 passes, and returned 3 interceptions for 98 yards in 16 games. With his 172nd consecutive start in Week 6 (October 17), Barber surpassed Dick LeBeau for most consecutive starts by an NFL cornerback and played in his 200th career game two weeks later.  On November 21, 2010, Barber became the only player in NFL history with at least 25 sacks (26 total) and 40 interceptions with a 21–0 win over the San Francisco 49ers.

2011
Starting all 16 games as a right cornerback, Barber had 79 tackles, 9 passes defended, 1 safety, and 3 interceptions returned for 12 yards.  On October 23 (Week 7), in an NFL International Series game against the Chicago Bears held in London, England, Barber recorded his first career safety when he tackled Matt Forte in the end zone.

2012
On May 15, 2012, Barber officially switched positions to become a free safety. Barber started all 16 games for the 13th straight season and had 91 tackles, 13 passes defended, 4 interceptions returned for 160 yards, and a forced fumble. On Week 6 (October 14) against the Kansas City Chiefs, Barber intercepted a pass from Brady Quinn and returned the interception 78 yards for a touchdown during the third quarter and also blocked a punt.

In this season's roster, Barber was the only member of the Super Bowl XXXVII championship team still active with the team. Responding to media speculation about retirement, Barber commented in December: "I’m not ready to make a decision on it. I’m pretty sure it will play itself out when the time comes."

Retirement
On May 8, 2013, Barber announced his retirement. At the time of his retirement, he was the active leader in defensive touchdowns scored, with 14.

NFL career statistics

Regular season

 Barber returned a blocked punt for a touchdown, which is officially recognized as a punt return touchdown as the ball traveled past the line of scrimmage.
 Barber did not start the Week 10 game vs the Kansas City Chiefs, as such his record streak of consecutive starts did not begin until the Week 11 game vs the Atlanta Falcons.

NFL records
 Most consecutive starts by a defensive back: 215 (224 including playoffs), 1999–2012
 Most consecutive starts by a cornerback: 200 (209 including playoffs), 1999–2012
 Only player in NFL history with 45+ interceptions and 25+ sacks

Buccaneers franchise records
 Most interceptions in a single season: 10 (2001)
 Most interceptions in a career: 47
 Most pass deflections in a career: 197
 2nd most fumble recoveries in a career: 12
 Most non-offensive touchdowns in a career: 14
 Most starts in a career (any position): 232 (1997–2012)
 Most games played in a career (any position): 241 (1997–2012)
 Most sacks by a defensive back in a career: 28
 Most interceptions in a game: 3 (tied with Aqib Talib and Andrew Adams)
 Most fumble return touchdowns in a season: 2 (tied with Ndamukong Suh and Devin White)

Other work
In 2010, Barber appeared on the satirical sports show The Onion Sportsdome.

After his retirement, Barber joined Fox Sports as an NFL color analyst. From 2013 to 2019 he called NFL on Fox telecasts with Chris Myers and Kenny Albert, and contributed to studio programming on Fox Sports 1.

Since 2004, Ronde Barber has co-written eight children's books with his brother Tiki:
By My Brother's Side (2004)
Game Day (2005)
Teammates (2006)
Kickoff! (2007)
Go Long! (2008)
Wild Card (2009)
Red Zone (2010)
Goal Line (2011)

Personal life
Ronde Barber lives in Keystone, Florida. In Spring 2001 he married Filipino American Claudia Patron. She was a marketing and event planner. She is now with Diabetic Charitable Services.  They have two daughters Yammile Rose and Justyce Rosina.

References

External links
 Tampa Bay Buccaneers bio
 

1975 births
African-American players of American football
American color commentators
American football cornerbacks
American football safeties
American identical twins
Living people
National Conference Pro Bowl players
National Football League announcers
People with epilepsy
Players of American football from Virginia
Sportspeople from Roanoke, Virginia
Tampa Bay Buccaneers announcers
Tampa Bay Buccaneers players
American twins
Twin sportspeople
Virginia Cavaliers football players
21st-century African-American sportspeople
20th-century African-American sportspeople
Ed Block Courage Award recipients